Dichomeris leontovitchi is a moth in the family Gelechiidae. It was described by Jean Ghesquière in 1940. It is found in the Democratic Republic of the Congo.

References

Moths described in 1940
leontovitchi
Endemic fauna of the Democratic Republic of the Congo